Sir Hungerford Hoskyns, 4th Baronet (c. 1677–1767) was a British army officer and politician who sat in the House of Commons from 1717 to 1722.

Hoskyns was the second son of Sir John Hoskyns, 2nd Baronet MP  of Harewood Park, Herefordshire and his wife Jane, Lowe, daughter of Sir Gabriel Lowe of Newark, Gloucestershire.  He was admitted at Middle Temple in  1701. He joined the army during the war of the Spanish succession and was a Cornet in the 7th Dragoon Guards in 1705, lieutenant in 1708 and a lieutenant in the 3rd Hussars in 1709. He resigned from the army when he succeeded his brother in the baronetcy on 17 December 1711 and inherited the family estates. He married, in. 1716, Mary Leigh, daughter of Theophilus Leigh of Adlestrop, Gloucestershire, who was niece of James Brydges, 1st Duke of Chandos.

Hoskyns was returned unopposed as  Member of Parliament for Herefordshire at a by-election 6 March 1717. He was defeated at the 1722 general election as a result of his own tactlessness and unsubstantiated gossip. After his defeat he asked Chandos for  financial help, but was refused  on account of the losses Chandos had sustained in the South Sea Bubble. Hoskyns never stood for Parliament again.

He was one of the original backers of the Royal Academy of Music, establishing a London opera company which commissioned numerous works from Handel, Bononcini and others.

Hoskyns died at the age of 90 on 21 December 1767. He had two sons and two daughters and was succeeded in the baronetcy by his son Chandos.

References

1770s births
1767 deaths
7th Dragoon Guards officers
British MPs 1715–1722
Members of the Parliament of Great Britain for English constituencies
Baronets in the Baronetage of England
3rd The King's Own Hussars officers
British Army personnel of the War of the Spanish Succession